The International Student Film and Video Festival is the first international festival in Slovenia that is focused on student film and video production. Filofest festival takes place every two years at the Faculty of Arts, University of Ljubljana, since 2006. The festival is organized by the students of the Faculty of Arts as well as other Ljubljana faculties.

Along with its primary role as a film festival, the International Student Film and Video Festival Filofest is accompanied by additional programme: lectures, panel discussions, exhibitions, social gatherings, etc.

Before 2014, the competition part of the programme was opened exclusively to independent student films, whose authors were amateurs without any formal film education. Films directed by students of film academies or film schools were screened within the non-competition part of the programme. In 2014, the festival opened the competition programme to all student films, but also presented a special award to an independent student film. The festival accepts fiction, documentary, animated and experimental films, and music videos.

Awards 
Between 2006 and 2010, the best film, which received the main award of the festival, was chosen by the audience. The festival jury also presented awards to films that entered in the competition part of the programme:
the award for best film, best directing, best screenplay, best performance, best fiction film, best documentary film, best animated film, and best experimental film. In 2012 and 2014 all awards were presented by the jury, including main award for best film. In 2014, an additional award for best independent film was awarded.

Filofest 2006

Members of the jury gave special recognition to: ?orque, Hallucii, What Do We Need This For and Behind Closed Minds. The winning 
video of the video workshop was shot and edited by Agata Rosochacka, the director of the film Reflections.

Filofest 2007

Filofest 2007 was again hosted at the Faculty of Arts at the University of Ljubljana and took place between December 10 and December 14.

The winning video of the 'Video Workshop', THE LIPSTICK AND THE RAZOR, was directed by Simon Chang (shot by Valentin Perko and edited by Arnold Marko).

Filofest 2010

Filofest 2010 was again hosted at the Faculty of Arts at the University of Ljubljana and took place between December 6 and December 10.

Filofest 2012
Filofest 2012 was hosted at the Faculty of Arts at the University of Ljubljana and took place between December 12 and December 14.

Les Inattendus 
Filofest is partnered with the Les Inattendus festival from Lyon, France.

External links 
Filofest festival official website
Filofest on Twitter
Les Inattendus Festival official website
Faculty of Arts at the University of Ljubljana

Film festivals in Slovenia
Student film festivals
Cultural events in Ljubljana
University of Ljubljana
Students in Slovenia
Recurring events established in 2006